Gilbert Grosvenor may refer to:

Gilbert Hovey Grosvenor (1875–1966), first editor of National Geographic Magazine
Gilbert M. Grosvenor (born 1931), president of National Geographic Society